En Vivo Desde Bellas Artes is the second live album by Dominican Bachata Duo Monchy & Alexandra. It was released on May 20, 2008, by J&N Records, JVN Music, and Sony BMG Music Entertainment. It based on a concert in a venue called Bellas Artes (Fine Arts) in Puerto Rico. A concert film was also released on DVD.

Track listing

CD

DVD

Charts

References

Monchy & Alexandra live albums
2008 live albums
Live bachata albums
Spanish-language live albums